Ludwig Hofmeister (5 December 1887 – 3 October 1959) was a German footballer.

Career
Hofmeister made two appearances for Germany, appearing twice against the Netherlands in 1912 and 1914.

References

External links
 

1887 births
1959 deaths
People from Regensburg (district)
Sportspeople from the Upper Palatinate
Footballers from Bavaria
Association football goalkeepers
Germany international footballers
FC Bayern Munich footballers
Stuttgarter Kickers players

German footballers